Alfred Aston (16 May 1912 – 10 February 2003) was a French football winger and manager. He was part of France national team at the FIFA World Cup 1934 and 1938. He was capped 31 times for his country.

He played football until the age of 44, at FC Tours where he was both player and coach.

He was born to an English father and a French mother.

Honours
Red Star
 Coupe de France: 1942

References

External links
 
 
 

1912 births
2003 deaths
French people of English descent
French footballers
Association football wingers
France international footballers
1934 FIFA World Cup players
1938 FIFA World Cup players
Ligue 1 players
Ligue 2 players
RCP Fontainebleau players
Red Star F.C. players
Racing Club de France Football players
Angers SCO players
Stade Français (association football) players
Tours FC players
French football managers
Tours FC managers
CA Paris-Charenton managers
RCP Fontainebleau managers
Association football player-managers